"You Don't Know What Love Is (You Just Do as You're Told)" is a song written and recorded by the American alternative rock band The White Stripes. The song was first played live on June 29, 2007, in Calgary, Alberta, Canada, and is the second track from their sixth studio album Icky Thump. The track was released as a CD single on September 18, 2007, with the 7" vinyl version of the single following on September 25. The music video for "You Don't Know What Love Is (You Just Do as You're Told)" premiered on MTV2 Unleashed, as well as MTV.com and MTV2.com on July 30, 2007.

The video was filmed in front of the Hudson's Bay Company historical buildings in the Apex neighborhood of Iqaluit, the capital of the northern Canadian territory of Nunavut, while the band was on tour there.

Track listings
Compact Disc
"You Don't Know What Love Is (You Just Do as You're Told)" – 3:56
"You Don't Know What Love Is (You Just Do as You're Told)" (Frat Rock version)  – 3:45
"A Martyr for My Love for You" (Acoustic version)

7" vinyl 
"You Don't Know What Love Is (You Just Do as You're Told)"
"A Martyr for My Love for You" (Acoustic version)

Personnel
Jack White – vocals, guitars and keyboards
Meg White – drums and backing vocals

Cover versions
Australian R&B singer-songwriter Daniel Merriweather covered the song as a bonus track for the Japanese edition of his 2009 album Love & War.

References

External links
Music video
Some stills from the video

2007 singles
The White Stripes songs
Warner Records singles
XL Recordings singles
Songs written by Jack White
Music videos directed by The Malloys
2007 songs
Country rock songs